Toona ciliata is a forest tree in the mahogany family which grows throughout southern Asia from Afghanistan to Papua New Guinea and Australia.

Names
It is commonly known as the red cedar (a name shared by other trees), toon or toona (also applied to other members of the genus Toona), Australian red cedar, Burma cedar, Indian cedar, Moulmein cedar or the Queensland red cedar. It is also known as Indian mahogany. Indigenous Australian names include  Polai in the Illawarra. Woolia on the Richmond River, Mamin & Mugurpul near Brisbane, and Woota at Wide Bay. Also called Ai saria in Timor-Leste.

Description
The tree has extended compound leaves up to 90 cm with 10-14 pairs of leaflets which are narrow and taper towards the tip. Each leaflet is between 4.5 and 16 cm long. It is one of Australia's few native deciduous trees, with the leaves falling in autumn (late March) and growing back in spring (early September). The new leaf growth is reddish pink in colour.

The tree produces  masses of white flowers that are very small, white and tubular in shape. The fruits are green capsules which senesces to a brown colour and tear open into star shape to release seeds, which are small and winged.

Habitat
In Australia, the tree's natural habitat is subtropical forests of New South Wales and Queensland, much of which has been extensively cleared. The Australian population was formerly treated as a distinct species under the name Toona australis. The southernmost limit of natural distribution is on basaltic soils, growing west of the Princes Highway near the village of Termeil, south of Ulladulla, southern Illawarra, New South Wales. It also occurs naturally at Norfolk Island. The largest recorded T. ciliata tree in Australia grew near Nulla Nulla Creek, west of Kempsey, New South Wales and was felled in 1883.

It grows best in an environment with high light levels, however in the relative darkness of the rainforest understorey, it is less susceptible to attack by the cedar tip moth. The cedar tip moth lays its eggs on the tree's leading shoot, allowing the larvae to burrow into the stem. This causes dieback and a multi-branched tree with little commercial value. The tree exudes a chemical that the female cedar tip moth seeks out. This moth does not attack commercial plantings of Asian/African/Australian native meliaceas in South America. As a result, successful planting of Toona ciliata is being observed in many parts of Brazil, including genetic improvement and clonal production.

Uses
The timber is red in colour, easy to work and very highly valued. It was used extensively for furniture, wood panelling and construction, including shipbuilding, and was referred to as "red gold" by Australian settlers. Heavily and unsustainably exploited in the 19th and early 20th centuries, almost all the large trees have been cut out and the species is essentially commercially extinct. Availability of this timber is now limited. Timber is currently also harvested in New Guinea. Although it is not generally a viable plantation species, trees are regularly harvested by Forestry in the Atherton region of Queensland.

Other areas
The red cedar is widely planted in subtropical and tropical parts of the world as a shade tree and for its fast-growing aspect. It is grown in the Hawaiian Islands of the United States, and southern and eastern Africa. In parts of Zimbabwe and South Africa, it has naturalised; growing to maturity and spreading from seed.

Reproduction and dispersal
Toona ciliata reproduces by seed. It is a prolific seed producer and establishes readily.

Gallery

See also
 Cedar wood
 Macleay River
 Toona sureni

References

External links
 Australian timbers
 National Register of Big Trees
 Distribution Map

ciliata
Sapindales of Australia
Trees of Australia
Least concern flora of Australia
Least concern biota of Queensland
Flora of New South Wales
Flora of Queensland
Flora of Norfolk Island
Flora of tropical Asia
Flora of China